Tsambagarav National Park (also: Cambagarav Mountain) is a national park in Bayan-Ölgii Province of western Mongolia.

It has a notable population of snow leopards, amongst other species.

References

External links
Official Tourism Guide

National parks of Mongolia